Sir Thomas Moulson (sometimes spelled "Mowlson")  (1582–1638), an alderman and member of the Grocers' Company, was a Sheriff of London in 1624 and Lord Mayor of London in 1634. He represented the City of London as a Member of Parliament in 1628.

Sir Thomas was a native of Hargrave, Cheshire, and in 1627 built a combined chapel and school in the village which is now St Peter's Church, Hargrave.  He also set up a trust to maintain the chapel and school.

His wife, Lady Anne Moulson (née Radcliffe; 1576–1661), was commemorated in 1894 by the name of Radcliffe College. One of their grandsons, John Kendrick, became Lord Mayor of London (1634).

Notes

1582 births
1638 deaths
Sheriffs of the City of London
17th-century lord mayors of London
Members of the Parliament of England for the City of London
English MPs 1628–1629